James Robert Kelly (February 1, 1884 – April 10, 1961) was a Major League Baseball player. He played three seasons with the Pittsburgh Pirates (1914), Pittsburgh Rebels (1915), and the Boston Braves (1918).

References

Boston Braves players
Pittsburgh Pirates players
Pittsburgh Rebels players
Major League Baseball outfielders
Moose Jaw Robin Hoods players
Great Falls Electrics players
Helena Senators players
Columbus Senators players
Newark Bears (IL) players
Syracuse Stars (minor league baseball) players
Lawrence Merry Macks players
Hartford Senators players
Jersey City Skeeters players
Augusta Tygers players
Vicksburg Hill Billies players
Baseball players from New Jersey
People from Bloomfield, New Jersey
Sportspeople from Essex County, New Jersey
1884 births
1961 deaths